NH 120 may refer to:

 National Highway 120 (India)
 New Hampshire Route 120, United States